Matías Alonso Ruiz (born 8 April 1952 in La Línea de la Concepción) is a Spanish politician, secretary general of Citizens-Party of the citizens. He is also a regional depute of Catalonia.

External links

1952 births
People from La Línea de la Concepción
Citizens (Spanish political party) politicians
Living people
Members of the 12th Parliament of Catalonia